The third eye is a spiritual concept associated with enlightenment and direct communication with a higher plane of existence.

Third eye may also refer to:

Biology
 Parietal eye or a third eye
 Pineal gland or the third eye, a gland found in the brain of most vertebrates

Film
 The Third Eye (serial), a 1920 film serial
 The Third Eye (1929 film), a British film by Maclean Rogers
 The Third Eye (1966 film) or Il terzo occhio, an Italian film by Mino Guerrini
 Third Eye (2014 film), a Philippine horror film by Aloy Adlawan
 The 3rd Eye (2017 film), an Indonesian horror film
 The 3rd Eye 2, a 2019 sequel
 Teesri Aankh (1982 film), or The Third Eye, a 1982 Indian action-drama film
 Teesri Aankh: The Hidden Camera, or The Third Eye, a 2006 Indian action-techno thriller film

Television
 The Third Eye (American TV series), a Nickelodeon TV series
 The Third Eye (Norwegian TV series), a 2014–2016 crime drama
 Third Eye (2012 TV series), a Philippine horror fantasy series

Literature
 The Third Eye (book), a 1956 book by Lobsang Rampa
 The Third Eye (novel), a 1991 novel by Lois Duncan

Music

Albums
 Third Eye (Ben Allison album) (1999)
 Third Eye (Redd Kross album)
 Third Eye (Monsoon album)
 The Third Eye, an album by Cherry Filter

Songs
 "The Third Eye" (song), a song by the Pillows from My Foot
 "Third Eye", a song by Black Eyed Peas from Elephunk
 "Third Eye", a 2018 song by Emma Blackery
 "Third Eye", a 2015 song by Florence + The Machine from "How Big, How Blue, How Beautiful"
 "The Third Eye", a 1970 song by Gypsy from Gypsy
 "The Third Eye", a song by Nine Miles from Solomonic Polar Bear
 "Third Eye", a 1996 song by Tool from Ænima

Other uses
 Third eye, a bicycle front derailleur add-on
 The Third Eye or Le Troisième Oeil, a collection of paintings by Marcel Marceau

See also
 Teesri Aankh (disambiguation), Hindi for third eye